George Murray Royle (9 January 1843 – 26 February 1910) was an English first-class cricketer active 1871–81 who played for Nottinghamshire. He was born and died in Nottingham.

References

1843 births
1910 deaths
English cricketers
Nottinghamshire cricketers